Leonid Novitskiy (born 1 July 1968, in Chelyabinsk) is a Russian cross-country rally driver. He won the FIA Cross Country Rally World Cup in both 2010 and 2011, driving for the X-Raid BMW team. He made his Dakar Rally debut in 2006, and finished eighth in 2009. He took his first Dakar stage victory on the opening stage of the 2012 Dakar Rally, driving a Mini All4 Racing for the X-Raid team to lead the event overall.

Dakar Rally results

References

External links
Official website 

Russian rally drivers
Off-road racing drivers
1968 births
Sportspeople from Chelyabinsk
Dakar Rally drivers
Living people